The Columbus mayoral election of 1903 was the 54th mayoral election in Columbus. It was held on Saturday, April 4, 1903.  Democratic party incumbent mayor John N. Hinkle was defeated by Republican party nominee Robert H. Jeffrey.

References

Bibliography

Mayoral elections in Columbus, Ohio
1903 Ohio elections
Columbus